Werner Scharf (19 September 1905 – 30 April 1945) was a German actor. He appeared in more than 45 films between 1929 and 1945.

Personal life
Scharf served in the Volkssturm during the Second World War and was killed in action on 30 April 1945.

Selected filmography

 Impossible Love (1932) as Hagedorf
 Um das Menschenrecht (1934) as Red Leader
 Just Once a Great Lady (1934)
 An Ideal Husband (1935) as Vicount de Nanjac
 The Night With the Emperor (1936) as Adjutant de Brusset
 Under Blazing Heavens (1936) as The Emaos 1st Officer
 A Wedding Dream (1936)
 Madame Bovary (1937) as Léon Dupuis
 The Grey Lady (1937) as Jack Clark
 Sergeant Berry (1938) as Don José
 The Impossible Mister Pitt (1938) as José Galvez
 The Muzzle (1938) as Ali
 The Mystery of Betty Bonn (1938) as Seaman Finley
 Woman in the River (1939) as Keryllis
 Three Wonderful Days (1939)
 A Man Astray (1940) as Strakosch
 Clarissa (1941) as Paul Becker
 Pedro Will Hang (1941) as José
 Friedemann Bach (1941) as Dresdener Hof's Baron
 The Thing About Styx (1942) as Tschelebi
 Front Theatre (1942)
 Münchhausen (1943) as Prince Francesco d'Este
 Bravo Acrobat! (1943) as Fred Martoni
The Master of the Estate (1943) as Oskar von Halleborg
 A Wife for Three Days (1944) as Benno Schmitz
 Kolberg (1945) as Pietro Teulié

References

External links

1905 births
1945 deaths
German male film actors
20th-century German male actors
Actors from Leipzig
Volkssturm personnel killed in acton